Sussan Siavoshi is an Iranian-American political scientist and the Una Chapman Cox Distinguished Professor of International Affairs, Political Science at Trinity University.
She is editor-in-chief of the journal Iranian Studies.
She is known for her works on contemporary history of Iran.

Books
Montazeri: The Life and Thought of Iran's Revolutionary Ayatollah, Cambridge University Press, 2017
Liberal Nationalism In Iran: The Failure Of A Movement,  Westview Press, 1990

References

External links
Sussan Siavoshi

Living people
Year of birth missing (living people)
21st-century Iranian people
Iranian scholars
Trinity University (Texas) faculty
Ohio State University alumni
Iranian political scientists
American political scientists
Shiraz University alumni
Academic journal editors
Distinguished professors in the United States